Portland is an unincorporated community in Fremont County, Colorado, United States.

Description
The town is located along State Highway 120 in Fremont County, Colorado and is east of Florence.

History
The community was one of three factory towns built surrounding the Portland Cement plant, now Holcim. The other two factory towns nearby are Concrete and Cement.

A post office called Portland was established in 1900, and remained in operation until 1952. The community was named for the Portland cement manufactured here.

See also

References

External links

Unincorporated communities in Fremont County, Colorado
Unincorporated communities in Colorado
Company towns in Colorado